Bernardo Francisco Bello Gutiérrez (December 8, 1933 – September 14, 2018) was a Chilean footballer who played as a goalkeeper for Colo-Colo.

Titles
 Colo-Colo 1953, 1956, 1960 and 1963 (Chilean Primera División Championship), 1958 (Copa Chile)

Notes

References

External links
 
 Bernardo Bello at playmakerstats.com (English version of ceroacero.es)

1933 births
2018 deaths
Chilean footballers
Association football goalkeepers
Chile international footballers
Colo-Colo footballers
Chilean Primera División players
People from Quillota
Chile women's national football team managers